Amir Bourouh (born 5 January 2001) is a professional rugby league footballer who plays as a  for Barrow Raiders in the RFL Championship, on loan from the Salford Red Devils in the Betfred Super League.

He previously spent time on loan from Salford at the London Broncos in the RFL Championship.

Background
Bourouh was born in Huddersfield, West Yorkshire, England, but considers neighbouring Halifax as his hometown.

Career

Wigan Warriors
In 2019 he made his Super League début for Wigan against Salford.

Halifax
On 28 January 2021, it was reported that he had joined Halifax in the RFL Championship for a season-long loan.

Salford Red Devils
On 19 Aug 2021 it was reported that he had signed for Salford Red Devils in the Super League

References

External links
Wigan Warriors profile
SL profile

2001 births
Living people
Barrow Raiders players
English rugby league players
Halifax R.L.F.C. players
London Broncos players
Rugby league hookers
Rugby league players from Huddersfield
Salford Red Devils players
Wigan Warriors players